The 1993 Ilva Trophy was a women's tennis tournament played on outdoor clay courts at the Circulo Tennis Ilva Taranto in Taranto, Italy that was part of the WTA Tier IV category of the 1993 WTA Tour. It was the seventh edition of the tournament and was held from 27 April until 2 May 1993. Fifth-seeded Brenda Schultz won the singles title and earned $18,000 first-prize money.

Finals

Singles
 Brenda Schultz defeated   Debbie Graham 7–6(7–5), 6–2
 It was Schultz' 1st singles title of the year and the 3rd of her career.

Doubles
 Debbie Graham /  Brenda Schultz defeated  Petra Langrová /  Mercedes Paz 6–0, 6–4

References

External links
 ITF tournament edition details
 Tournament draws

Mantegazza Cup
Ilva Trophy
1993 in Italian women's sport
Ilva Trophy
Ilva Trophy
1993 in Italian tennis